Karl Karrer (22 March 1815 – 18 April 1886) was a Swiss politician and President of the Swiss National Council (1861/1862).

External links 
 
 

1815 births
1886 deaths
People from Bern
Swiss Calvinist and Reformed Christians
Members of the National Council (Switzerland)
Presidents of the National Council (Switzerland)